The 2014 Indian Super League playoffs were the first edition of the playoffs series that takes place after the Indian Super League regular season. The tournament began on 13 December and culminated on 20 December, with the first ever ISL final.

Atlético de Kolkata became the inaugural champions after defeating the Kerala Blasters in the final, 1–0. The goal was scored by Mohammed Rafique in the last minute of stoppage time.

Format
After a fourteen game regular season, the top four teams in the table qualify for the playoffs. The first place team at the end of the regular season played the fourth place team while the second place team took on the third. The semi-final round was played over two-legs while the final is played over one leg at a neutral venue.

Qualification

Bracket

Schedule

Semi-finals

|}

Leg 1

Leg 2

Kerala Blasters won 4–3 on aggregate

Atlético de Kolkata 0–0 Goa on aggregate. Atlético de Kolkata won 4–2 on penalties.

Final

See also
 2014–15 in Indian football
 2014 Indian Super League season

References